The Sonderend River, also known as the Riviersonderend (Afrikaans for River without an end), is a main tributary of the Breede River, located in Western Cape Province, South Africa. The village of Riviersonderend is believed to have taken its name from the river.

Naming 
In 1673, Willem ten Rhyne referred to the river as "sine fine flumen" (Latin for "endless river"). In 1707, Jan Hatogh, a Dutch East India Company horticulturist, referred to the river as the "Kantdydnn", likely derived from the Hessequa "Kamma-kan Kamma", roughly "water, endless water" or "endless river". The Hessequa were a local tribe of Khoi-khoi herders.

Dams in the River 
 Theewaterskloof Dam

See also 
 List of reservoirs and dams in South Africa

References 

Rivers of the Western Cape